The Law Reports of the Commonwealth, abbreviated LRC, are a series of law reports of landmark cases decided in the high and appellate courts of members of the Commonwealth of Nations. The LRC were first published in 1985 and, as of 2022, are published in five volumes each year, in both digital and hard copy formats.

History 
The LRC were first published in 1985 by Professional Books of Oxford, with the 'active encouragement' and editorial advice of the Commonwealth Secretariat. Early volumes covering 1980–1984 included cases on commercial law only, with volumes covering 1985 and later years further encompassing cases on constitutional and criminal law. In 1993, the LRC's three sub-series, each covering commercial, constitutional, and criminal law, respectively, were discontinued in favour of a single consolidated series. By 1994, the Secretariat described the LRC as 'an authoritative and frequently cited source of precedents and judgments from around the Commonwealth.' The series celebrated the publication of their one-hundredth volume in 2009.

Contents 
The LRC 'report key cases of international significance from all Commonwealth countries,' including 'judgments not reported elsewhere.' The series now encompass, in addition to commercial, constitutional, and criminal law, a broader remit of case law, including that regarding 'arbitration, conflict of laws, environment, human rights, immigration, property and tort.' Moreover, the series publish an annual index of cases, an annual 'analysis of legal trends in the Commonwealth,' and an occasional cumulative index of cases.

Citation 
Citations to the LRC are the fourth-ranked preference for proceedings before the Caribbean Court of Justice. Cases reported in the LRC are cited as in the accompanying table. For instance, the first record of said table indicates that the decision of the Trinidad and Tobago Supreme Court, entitled Juman v Attorney General of Trinidad and Tobago, was reported in 2017 in volume 2 of the Law Reports of the Commonwealth, with its text starting on page 610.

Notes and references

Explanatory footnotes

Short citations

Full citations 

 
 
 
 
 
 
 
 
 
 
 
 
 
 
 
 
 

Case law reporters